van Breda is a surname. Notable people with the surname include:

Herman Van Breda (1911–1974), Belgian philosopher
Jacob Gijsbertus Samuël van Breda (1788–1867), Dutch biologist and geologist
Michiel van Breda (1775–1847), first mayor of Cape Town
Scott van Breda (born 1991), South African rugby union player
 the family at the centre of the 2015 Van Breda murders in South Africa

See also 
 Club Resorts Ltd v Van Breda, a Supreme Court of Canada case about court jurisdiction

Dutch-language surnames
Surnames of Dutch origin